The Ostend Pirates are an American football team based in Ostend. The Pirates are currently members of the Flemish American Football League (FAFL) conference in the Belgian Football League (BFL).

History

Ostend Tigers
The original team were the Ostend Tigers. They merged with the Izegem Redskins to form the West Flanders Tribes.

West Flanders Tribes (2001-2012)

The team is the continuation of the former West Flanders Tribes which split up into the Ostend Pirates and the Izegem Tribes.

2014 season
The Pirates started off their first season very strong. Ostend won their first match-up against their former West Flanders Tribes teammates from Izegem Tribes with an 8-12 score. They finished in the semi-finals against the Ghent Gators who would win the Belgian Bowl.

2014 Playoffs

2015 season

2015 Playoffs

References

External links
 Pirates homepage

American football teams in Belgium
2012 establishments in Belgium
American football teams established in 2012
Sport in Ostend